Dargun is a town in the Mecklenburgische Seenplatte district, in Mecklenburg-Western Pomerania, Germany. It is situated  km west of Demmin. It is famous for Dargun Palace, a former Cistercian abbey.

History
From 1815 to 1918 Dargun was part of the Grand Duchy of Mecklenburg-Schwerin. The Palace was burned down by Red Army soldiers after the conquest of the town in late April 1945.

References

External links

Official website of Dargun (German)

Cities and towns in Mecklenburg
Populated places established in 1875
Grand Duchy of Mecklenburg-Schwerin
1875 establishments in Germany